Vladimir Gessen may refer to:

Vladimir Matveevich Gessen (1868–1920), Russian jurist and politician
Vladimir Gessen, Venezuelan politician, journalist and psychologist